Gene Perla (born March 1, 1940) is an American jazz bassist.

Career
At the Berklee School of Music and the Boston Conservatory Perla concentrated on piano before moving to double bass. In 1969 he spent one year as a member of the Woody Herman Orchestra. During the early 1970s, he worked with Elvin Jones, Sonny Rollins, Sarah Vaughan, and The Thad Jones/Mel Lewis Orchestra. In 1975 he started the band Stone Alliance with Don Alias and Steve Grossman. Also in the 1970s he founded PM Records ("PM" for Perla Music), which released albums by Steve Grossman, Elvin Jones,  Pat LaBarbera, and Dave Liebman. He has taught at Lehigh University and the New School of Jazz & Contemporary Music.

Discography

As leader
 Bill's Waltz (PM, 2008)
 Out of the Gate (PM, 2017)

As sideman
With Miles Davis
 The Complete Jack Johnson Sessions (Columbia, 1970)

With Frank Foster
 The Loud Minority (Mainstream, 1972)

With Elvin Jones
 Genesis (Blue Note, 1971)
 Merry-Go-Round (Blue Note, 1971)
 Mr. Jones (Blue Note, 1972) 
 Live at the Lighthouse (Blue Note, 1972)
 Hollow Out with Masabumi Kikuchi (Philips, 1972)
 At This Point in Time (Blue Note, 1973)
 Elvin Jones is "On the Mountain" (PM, 1975)
 New Agenda (Vanguard, 1975)
 The Truth: Heard Live at the Blue Note (Half Note, 1999)

With Jeremy Steig
 Energy (Capitol, 1971)
 Fusion (Groove Merchant, 1972)

With Mickey Tucker
 Triplicity (Xanadu, 1975)

With Nina Simone
 To Love Somebody (album)(1968)
 Here Comes the Sun (album)()
 A Very Rare Evening (album)()

References

External links
 Official site

1940 births
Living people
People from Woodcliff Lake, New Jersey
20th-century American bass guitarists
20th-century American male musicians
American jazz bass guitarists
American male bass guitarists
American male jazz musicians
Berklee College of Music alumni